Harry Fry (born 5 April 2001) is a Welsh rugby union player for Dragons in the Pro14. Fry's primary position is prop.

Rugby Union career

Professional career

Fry came through the Gloucester academy, and while studying at Hartpury College represented Hartpury University making 1 appearance, including a debut in the RFU Championship. He joined Dragons academy ahead of the 2020–21 Pro14 season, joining his brother Ben.

External links
itsrugby Profile

References

2001 births
Living people
Dragons RFC players
Rugby union props
Hartpury University R.F.C. players
Welsh rugby union players